Gwa Kyun, also known as Gwa Chaung, is a small island off the coast of Rakhine State, Burma.

Geography
The island is wooded, rising to a height of 44 m. Its western coast is rocky, while its eastern shore is a white sandy beach.

See also
List of islands of Burma

References

External links
National Geospatial-Intelligence Agency - Gwa Kyun: Burma 

Islands of Myanmar
Rakhine State